The Embassy of Germany in Bangkok is the diplomatic mission of the Federal Republic of Germany to the Kingdom of Thailand. The embassy is located in the capital Bangkok (9 South Sathorn Road, Yan Nawa) on an area of c. 28,000m². The building is owned by the Government of Germany.

Current ambassador is Georg Schmidt since 2018.

There are three Honorary consulates:
Honorary consulate Northern Thailand in Chiang Mai
Honorary consulate in South Thailand in Phuket
Honorary consulate Eastern Thailand in Pattaya

Organization
The embassy consists of seven sections.

Administration
Political Affairs (political section)
Press relations (press office)
Economic section
Legal and Consular Affairs with Visa section
Cultural Affairs
Military Attaché

Activities

German nationals can register with the Embassy in order to receive information on consular matters and other Embassy activities. As being part of the German government, it oversees Goethe-Institut Bangkok. 
The embassy is a co-host of the annually held "Fest der Deutschen" (celebration of Germans [in Thailand]) in Bangkok, a major cultural event with more than 1,000 guests.

See also
 Diplomatic missions of Germany
 Foreign relations of Germany
 List of diplomatic missions in Thailand
 Germany–Thailand relations
 Thai embassy in Berlin (Diplomatic missions of Thailand)

Notes and references

External links
 www.bangkok.diplo.de

Bangkok
Germany–Thailand relations
Germany